Yasnye Zori is a rural locality (a village) in Styopantsevskoye Rural Settlement, Vyaznikovsky District, Vladimir Oblast, Russia. The population was 3 as of 2010.

Geography 
Yasnye Zori is located on the Vazhel River, 39 km southwest of Vyazniki (the district's administrative centre) by road. Burtsevo is the nearest rural locality.

References 

Rural localities in Vyaznikovsky District